Lyle L. Hanson (May 11, 1935 – December 23, 2020) was a North Dakota Democratic-NPL Party member of the North Dakota House of Representatives, representing the 12th district from 1979 to 2013. He died on December 23, 2020, aged 85.

References

External links
North Dakota Legislative Assembly - Representative Lyle Hanson official ND Senate website
Project Vote Smart - Representative Lyle L. Hanson (ND) profile
Follow the Money - Lyle Hanson
2006 2004 2000 1998 campaign contributions
North Dakota Democratic-NPL Party - Representative Lyle Hanson profile

1935 births
2020 deaths
Minnesota State University Moorhead alumni
People from Jamestown, North Dakota
People from Sargent County, North Dakota
University of North Dakota alumni
Educators from North Dakota
Democratic Party members of the North Dakota House of Representatives